is one of the 7 wards of the city of Kawasaki in Kanagawa Prefecture, Japan. As of 2010, the ward had an estimated population of 215,158 and a density of 13,150 persons per km². The total area is 16.38 km².

Geography
Takatsu Ward is located in eastern Kanagawa Prefecture, in the north-center portion of the city of Kawasaki, bordering on Tokyo. It is bordered to the north by the Tama River.

Surrounding municipalities
Tama-ku, Kawasaki
Miyamae-ku, Kawasaki
Nakahara-ku, Kawasaki
Kōhoku-ku, Yokohama
Tsuzuki-ku, Yokohama
Setagaya-ku, Tokyo

Neighborhoods
Mizonokuchi, Futago, Seta, Suwa, Kitamigata, Shimonoge, Hisamoto, Sakado, Kuji, Unane, Shimo-Sakunobe, Kami-Sakunobe, Mukaigaoka, Suenaga, Kajigaya, Shinsaku, Chitose, Chitose-Shin-cho, Shibokuchi, Shibokuchi-Fujimi-dai, Hisasue, Kanigaya, Akutsu, and Nogawa.

History
Archaeologists have found stone tools from the Japanese Paleolithic period and ceramic shards from the Jōmon period at numerous locations in the area. Under the Nara period Ritsuryō system, it became part of Tachibana District Musashi Province. By the Heian period it was part of a shōen coming under control the Later Hōjō clan from Odawara in the late Muromachi period. In the Edo period, it was administered as tenryō territory controlled directly by the Tokugawa shogunate, but administered through various hatamoto.
After the Meiji Restoration, the area was divided into eight villages within Tachibana District in the new Kanagawa Prefecture on April 1, 1889. These areas were annexed by the neighboring city of Kawasaki from 1937-1938. The area became part of a huge government sponsored housing project from the 1950s and 1960s. The area became part of Tama Ward with the division of the city of Kawasaki into wards from April 1972. In July 1982, Miyamae Ward was separated from Takatsu Ward.

Economy

Takatsu Ward is largely a regional commercial center and bedroom community for central Kawasaki and Tokyo. Industries are centered on food processing, electronics and precision equipment, and include:
The corporate headquarters of Mitutoyo and NKK Switches

 - a business incubation center. [ also Research center for L'oreal company.]

Transportation

Railway
JR East -  Nambu Line
 -  - 
 Tokyu Corporation – Tōkyū Den-en-toshi Line / Tōkyū Ōimachi Line
 -  -  -  (through service to Tokyo Metro Hanzomon Line and Tobu Isesaki Line)

Highway
 National Route 409 (Fuchu Road, as )
 National Route 466 (No. 3 Keihin Road, as )

Education

Senzoku Gakuen College of Music

Municipal junior high schools:

 Higashitakatsu (東高津中学校)
 Higashitachibana (東橘中学校)
 Nishitakatsu (西高津中学校)
 Tachibana (橘中学校)
 Takatsu (高津中学校)

Municipal elementary schools:

 Higashi Takatsu (東高津小学校)
 Hisamoto (久本小学校)
 Hisasue (久末小学校)
 Kajigaya (梶ヶ谷小学校)
 Kamisakunobe (上作延小学校)
 Kuji (久地小学校)
 Minamihara (南原小学校)
 Nishi Kajigaya (西梶ヶ谷小学校)
 Sakado (坂戸小学校)
 Shibokuchi (子母口小学校)
 Shimosakunobe (下作延小学校)
 Shinsaku (新作小学校)
 Suenaga (末長小学校)
 Tachibana (橘小学校)
 Takatsu (高津小学校)

There is a North Korean school, Nambu Korean Primary School (南武朝鮮初級学校).

Shrines and temples
 Futako Shrine

Noted people from Takatsu Ward
Tarō Okamoto, artist
Yoshinobu Minowa, professional soccer player
Masahiro Abe, professional baseball player
Riko Narumi, actress
Eugene Tzigane, conductor

References

External links

 Takatsu Ward Office  (Archive)

Wards of Kawasaki, Kanagawa